Pembélé is a surname. Notable people with the surname include:

 Andy Pembélé (born 2000), French footballer
 Timothée Pembélé (born 2002), French footballer

See also
 Dembélé

Surnames of African origin